Liu Jinfeng (born 3 July 1977) is a Chinese biathlete. She competed in the women's relay event at the 1998 Winter Olympics.

References

1977 births
Living people
Biathletes at the 1998 Winter Olympics
Chinese female biathletes
Olympic biathletes of China
Place of birth missing (living people)
Asian Games medalists in biathlon
Biathletes at the 1996 Asian Winter Games
Biathletes at the 1999 Asian Winter Games
Asian Games gold medalists for China
Medalists at the 1996 Asian Winter Games
Sport shooters from Dalian
Skiers from Dalian